60 Seconds is a short-news programme which ran between shows on BBC Three (and before that BBC Choice). It was broadcast under the BBC News format and branding. The presenters included Tasmin Lucia-Khan, Andy May, Matt Cooke, James Dagwell, Claudia-Liza Vanderpuije and Sam Naz. The programme was similar to the now defunct BBC News Summary that aired on BBC One, also broadcast under the BBC News format.

Format 
The programme lasted for 60 seconds as the name suggests, during which time the presenter condensed some of the day's news, sport and entertainment stories into a 60-second bulletin. This made it similar to FYI Daily, a programme of the same length which airs on ITV2, ITV3, ITV4 and ITVBe.

60 Seconds ran from 7:00pm to 12:15am with a bulletin at the top of the hour or after a programme had ended, if more than an hour. Throughout the bulletin, a line gradually crossed the screen which effectively counted down the seconds. There were sets of pictures running simultaneously for each story. Five stories were featured in every bulletin.

During the 2012 Summer Olympics and 2014 Commonwealth Games, bulletins ran from 7:00am to 12:15am with a round-up of the day's other news stories.

History 
60 Seconds was launched on 16 July 2001 on BBC Choice, the precursor to BBC Three, to appeal to those within the 18–34 age group; BBC Three's target audience, and also the demographic with lowest news-watching and voter turnout. When BBC Choice was replaced by BBC Three on 9 February 2003, the programme was kept and the titles updated to match the style of The 7 O'Clock News also on the channel.

There was a rebrand of BBC Three on 12 February 2008, during which the identity of 60 Seconds also changed to match the new colour scheme of the channel. The first broadcast of the revamped 60seconds saw a new take on the news; the headlines of news channels across the world, such as Al Jazeera and CNN, are read as opposed to the original UK headline bulletins. However, maintaining its original purpose, the UK's headlines are still included in the bulletin, as well as most of the original properties of 60 Seconds, with the keeping of the two images–videos running parallel to each other.

On 18 March 2013, 60 Seconds, along with the rest of BBC News, moved to Broadcasting House.

This can be used as a stepping stone as James Dagwell moved to BBC World News and the simulcast between BBC World News and BBC News Channel overnight as a presenter. Charlene White is now a regular on ITV News. Tina Daheley now co-presents Freespeech, Susannah Streeter is another BBC World News presenter.

In October 2013 it was announced by Director-General Tony Hall that the programme would be rebranded to bring it under the Newsbeat banner of the BBC's youth radio station, Radio 1.

In March 2014, it was announced that 60 Seconds would be axed as well as its main channel, BBC Three in late 2015. All current programmes on BBC Three would be moved onto the BBC iPlayer website, but it was not revealed if 60 Seconds would be moved online too. However the final decision was announced in autumn 2015. It was now announced that the change would happen in February 2016 with 60 Seconds being axed.

The final 60 Seconds aired in the early hours of 16 February with the final words from Sam Naz saying: "Thank you for watching and for all of your lovely messages. Goodnight!"

60 Seconds did not return following the relaunch of the BBC Three channel in February 2022; it was instead succeeded by The Catch Up. 
 Tazeen Ahmad (2001–05)
 James Dagwell (2006–08)
 Amy Garcia
 Tasmin Lucia-Khan (2008–2010)
 Andy May (2008–2010)
 Charlene White
 Matt Cooke (2008–2011)
 Kasia Madera
 Sam Naz (2011–2016)
 Christopher Lee Johnson
 Karl Riley

References

External links 
 BBC News
 60 Seconds at IMDB.com

2001 British television series debuts
2016 British television series endings
BBC television news shows
British television news shows